Samira TV is an Algerian television channel specialising in cooking TV shows, focusing on Algerian cuisine.

References

External links
 

Television stations in Algeria
Arab mass media
Television in Algeria
Arabic-language television stations
Arabic-language television
Food and drink television
Television channels and stations established in 2013
2013 establishments in Algeria